Orblivion is the fourth studio album by English electronic music group The Orb, released on 24 February 1997 by Island Records. With the album, the group, reunited with Andy Hughes and Steve Hillage, returned to their spacy sounds typical of U.F.Orb (1992). Though Orblivion was recorded in May 1996, it was not released until almost a year later, due to Island Records' desire to promote it as a follow-up to U2's Pop.

Orblivion sold well in Europe and the United States, reaching number nineteen on the UK Albums Chart and number 174 on the US Billboard 200, while its lead single "Toxygene" became the highest-charting single by The Orb, reaching number four in the UK. However, the album received a lukewarm reception from the British music press, but similarly to the case of Orbus Terrarum, it received better praise from American critics, with Rolling Stone calling it a "scintillating contrast of chaos and euphony".

To support the album, The Orb embarked on the Organic Tour with Orbital, Meat Beat Manifesto, Underworld, Zion Train, and The Chemical Brothers. The Village Voice described The Orb as "on its way down" and the stresses of touring sat heavily on member Alex Paterson, but The Orb decided not to "pack it in" and instead continued touring and producing.

Composition
Orblivion features many samples, including "72", which features a clip from Hair proclaiming "the youth of America on LSD!". The track "S.A.L.T." is based on samples taken from Mike Leigh's film Naked, which features rantings from the main character's apocalyptic preaching.

Track listing

References

External links
 
 

The Orb albums
1997 albums
Island Records albums